al-Shakūr (ALA-LC romanization of ) is one of the names of Allah.  It is part of the 99 Names of God.

Meaning
al-Shakūr is translated into "The Appreciative".  In his book, "Al-Maqsad Al-Asna fi Sharah Asma' Allahu al-Husna" (aka The best means in explaining Allah's Beautiful Names), Imam Al Ghazali translates al-Shakūr as "The One Who Expresses Thankfulness by rewarding bounteously".  He goes on to say that al-Shakūr is "the One Who rewards trivial pious deeds with many grades, and the one who gives unlimited happiness in the life to come for activity during a limited period (in this life).  The one who rewards the good deed with multiples of it is said to be thankful for that good deed, and the one who praises the performer of this good deed is also said to be thankful for it.  If you consider multiple rewards (to be the criterion in this matter), then there can be no absolute al-Shakūr except God Most High, because His increase of the reward is not restricted and limited since the blessings of Paradise are infinite."

Occurrence in the Quran
Al-Shakūr can be found in various ayat in the Quran.  For example, it is found in verses 35:30, 35:34, 42:23, 64:17.  Muslims tend to quote verse 2:261 when mentioning Allah's Generosity and Gratefulness, "The likeness of those who spend their wealth in Allah's way is as the likeness of a grain which grows seven ears, in every ear a hundred grains. Allah gives increase manifold to whom He Will. Allah is All-Embracing, All-Knowing."

Occurrence in Hadith 
To shed further light upon The Appreciative Attribute of Allah, one can refer to the upcoming traditions found in classical Islamic text.

Imam Muslim reports that Abu Hurairah related that Muhammad  said:  "Allah the Majestic and Exalted Said: 'Every deed of man will receive ten to 700 times rewards, except Siyam (fasting), for it is for Me and I shall reward it (as I Like). There are two occasions of joy for one who fasts: one when he breaks the fast and the other when he will meet his Lord'."

Imam Buhkari and Imam Muslim reported that Muhammad said,  "Allah Ordered (the appointed angels over you) that the good and the bad deeds be written, and He then showed (the way) how (to write). If someone intends to do a good deed and he does not do it, then Allah will write for him a full good deed; and if he intends to do a good deed and actually did it, then Allah will write for him (its reward equal) from ten to seven hundred times to many more times. And If someone intends to do a bad deed and he does not do it, then Allah will write for him a full good deed (in his account) with Him, and if he intends to do a bad deed and actually did it, then Allah will write for him one bad deed."

References

Shakur